Since the beginning of his career, American singer Elvis Presley has had an extensive cultural impact. According to Rolling Stone, "It was Elvis who made rock 'n' roll the international language of pop." The Rolling Stone Encyclopedia of Rock & Roll describes Presley as "an American music giant of the 20th century who single-handedly changed the course of music and culture in the mid-1950s". His recordings, dance moves, attitude and clothing came to be seen as embodiments of rock and roll. His music was  heavily influenced by African-American blues, Christian gospel, and Southern country. In a list of the greatest English language singers, as compiled by Q magazine, Presley was ranked first, and second in the list of greatest singers of the 20th century by BBC Radio. Some people claim that Presley created a whole new style of music: "It wasn't black, wasn't white, wasn't pop or wasn't country—it was different." He gave teens music to grow up with and listen to, as most singers in his time created music geared for adults. 

Presley sang hard-driving rock and roll, rockabilly dance songs, and ballads, laying a commercial foundation upon which other rock musicians would build their careers. African-American performers such as Big Joe Turner, Wynonie Harris and Fats Domino came to national prominence after Presley's acceptance among mass audiences of white American adults. Singers like Jerry Lee Lewis, the Everly Brothers, Chuck Berry, Bo Diddley, Little Richard, Buddy Holly, Johnny Cash, Roy Orbison and others immediately followed in his wake. John Lennon later commented: "Before Elvis, there was nothing."

During the post-WWII economic boom of the 1950s, many parents were able to give their teenage children much higher weekly allowances, signaling a shift in the buying power and purchasing habits of American teens. During the 1940s bobby soxers had idolized Frank Sinatra, but the buyers of his records were mostly between the ages of eighteen and twenty-two. Presley triggered a lot of demand for his records by near-teens and early teens aged ten and up. Along with Presley's "ducktail" haircut, the demand for black slacks and loose, open-necked shirts resulted in new lines of clothing for teenage boys whereas a girl might get a pink portable 45 rpm record player for her bedroom. Meanwhile, American teenagers began buying newly available portable transistor radios and listened to rock and roll on these, helping to propel that fledgling industry from an estimated 100,000 units sold in 1955 to 5,000,000 units by the end of 1958. Teens were asserting more independence and Presley became a national symbol of their parents' consternation.

Presley's impact on the American youth consumer market was noted on the front page of The Wall Street Journal on the December 31, 1956, when business journalist Louis M. Kohlmeier wrote, "Elvis Presley today is a business", and reported on the singer's record and merchandise sales. Half a century later, historian Ian Brailsford (University of Auckland, New Zealand) commented, "The phenomenal success of Elvis Presley in 1956 convinced many doubters of the financial opportunities existing in the youth market."

African American music influence

Debt to African American music, impact on Black artists 
In spite of the facts that Nat King Cole had the #7 song in 1959, and the #1 song in 1961, and Chuck Berry had a major hit with "Maybellene" in 1955, in the United States in the 1950s legal segregation and discrimination against African Americans were common, especially in the Deep South. Presley would nevertheless publicly cite his debt to African American music, pointing to artists such as B. B. King, Arthur "Big Boy" Crudup, Ivory Joe Hunter, and Fats Domino. The reporter who conducted Presley's first interview in New York City in 1956 noted that he named blues singers who "obviously meant a lot to him. [He] was very surprised to hear him talk about the Black performers down there and about how he tried to carry on their music." Later that year in Charlotte, North Carolina, Presley was quoted as saying: "The colored folks been singing it and playing it just like I'm doin' now, man, for more years than I know. They played it like that in their shanties and in their juke joints and nobody paid it no mind 'til I goosed it up. I got it from them. Down in Tupelo, Mississippi, I used to hear old Arthur Crudup bang his box the way I do now and I said if I ever got to a place I could feel all old Arthur felt, I'd be a music man like nobody ever saw." Little Richard said of Presley: "He was an integrator. Elvis was a blessing. They wouldn't let Black music through. He opened the door for Black music." B. B. King said he began to respect Presley after he did Arthur "Big Boy" Crudup material and that after he met him, he thought the singer really was something else and was someone whose music was growing all the time right up to his death.

Up to the mid-1950s, Black artists had sold minuscule amounts of their recorded music relative to the national market potential. Black songwriters had mostly limited horizons and could only eke out a living. But after Presley purchased the music of  African American Otis Blackwell and had his "Gladys Music" company hire talented black songwriter Claude Demetrius, the industry underwent a dramatic change. In the spring of 1957, Presley invited African American performer Ivory Joe Hunter to visit Graceland and the two spent the day together, singing "I Almost Lost My Mind" and other songs. Of Presley, Hunter commented, "He showed me every courtesy, and I think he's one of the greatest."

Distrust of Elvis, transgression of societal boundaries 
"Racists attacked rock and roll because of the mingling of black and white people it implied and achieved, and because of what they saw as black music's power to corrupt through vulgar and animalistic rhythms. ... The popularity of Elvis Presley was similarly founded on his transgressive position with respect to racial and sexual boundaries. ... White cover versions of hits by black musicians ... often outsold the originals; it seems that many Americans wanted black music without the black people in it," and Elvis had undoubtedly "derived his style from the Negro rhythm-and-blues performers of the late 1940s."

Sam Phillips had anticipated problems promoting Presley's Sun singles. He recalled;

The white disc-jockeys wouldn't touch... Negroes' music and the Negro disc-jockeys didn't want anything to do with a record made by a white man.

Ironically, hillbilly singer Mississippi Slim, one of Presley's heroes, was one of the singer's fiercest critics. Phillips felt Dewey Phillips—a white DJ who did play 'black' music—would promote the new material, but many of the hundreds of listeners who contacted the station when "That's All Right" was played were sure Presley must be black. The singer was interviewed several times on air by the DJ and was pointedly asked which school he had attended, to convince listeners that he was white.

In 1957, Presley had to defend himself from claims of being a racist: he was alleged to have said: "The only thing Negro people can do for me is to buy my records and shine my shoes." The singer always denied saying, or ever wanting to say, such a racist remark. Jet magazine, run by and for African-Americans, subsequently investigated the story and found no basis to the claim. However, the Jet journalist did find plenty of testimony that Presley judged people "regardless of race, color or creed."

Certain elements in American society have dismissed Presley as no more than a racist Southerner who stole black music. The "Elvis stole black music" theme is an enduring one with arguments for and against published in books. A southern background combined with a performing style largely associated with African Americans had led to "bitter criticism by those who feel he stole a good thing", as Tan magazine surmised. No wonder that Elvis became "a symbol of all that was oppressive to the black experience in the Western Hemisphere."  A black southerner in the late 1980s even captured that sentiment: "To talk to Presley about blacks was like talking to Adolf Hitler about the Jews."

In his scholarly work Race, Rock, and Elvis, Tennessee State University professor Michael T. Bertrand examined the relationship between popular culture and social change in America and these allegations against Presley. Professor Bertrand postulated that Presley's rock and roll music brought an unprecedented access to African American culture that challenged the 1950s segregated generation to reassess ingrained segregationist stereotypes. The American Historical Review wrote that the author "convincingly argues that the black-and-white character of the sound, as well as Presley's own persona, helped to relax the rigid color line and thereby fed the fires of the civil rights movement." The U.S. government report stated: "Presley has been accused of "stealing" black rhythm and blues, but such accusations indicate little knowledge of his many musical influences ... However much Elvis may have 'borrowed' from black blues performers (e.g., 'Big Boy' Crudup, 'Big Mama' Thornton), he borrowed no less from white country stars (e.g., Ernest Tubb, Bill Monroe) and white pop singers," and most of his borrowings came from the church; its gospel music was his primary musical influence and foundation."

Whether or not it was justified, the fact remains that distrust of Presley was common amongst the general African-American population after the accusations of racism were made public. According to George Plasketes, several songs by other performers came out after the singer's death which are a part of a "demystification process as they portray Elvis as a racist." In his book, Colored White: Transcending the Racial Past, David Roediger considers contemporary "w*ggers" in light of the tensions in racial impersonation embodied by Elvis Presley. Chuck D and others have at one point or another publicly condemned Presley for "stealing" black music. However, in 2002, Chuck D, in an interview with the Associated Press in connection with the 25th Anniversary of Presley's death, explained how his feelings for Elvis' legacy were no longer those as originally suggested by the lyrics in  "Fight The Power", a song which he had written 12 years earlier. When broadcast as a part of the NBC-produced documentary "Elvis Lives", Chuck D had the following to say about Presley: "Elvis was a brilliant artist. As a musicologist—and I consider myself one—there was always a great deal of respect for Elvis, especially during his Sun sessions. As a black person, we all knew that. (In fact), Eminem is the new Elvis because, number one, he had the respect for black music that Elvis had."

As one writer stated on the controversy, "Music is a universal language, like mathematics and money. It knows few borders. Jazz began in the return of black bands from graveyard interments in New Orleans. But the bands played white hymns out to the above-ground graves."

Danger to American culture

By the spring of 1956, Presley was fast becoming a national phenomenon and teenagers came to his concerts in unprecedented numbers. There were many riots at his early concerts. Scotty Moore recalled: "He'd start out, 'You ain't nothin' but a Hound Dog', and they'd just go to pieces. They'd always react the same way. There'd be a riot every time." Bob Neal wrote: "It was almost frightening, the reaction... from teenage boys. So many of them, through some sort of jealousy, would practically hate him." In Lubbock, Texas, a teenage gang fire-bombed Presley's car. Some performers became resentful (or resigned to the fact) that Presley going on stage before them would "kill" their own act; he thus rose quickly to top billing. At the two concerts he performed at the 1956 Mississippi-Alabama Fair and Dairy Show, one hundred National Guardsmen were on hand to prevent crowd trouble.

Perceived moral and sexual impact 
Presley was considered by some to be a threat to the moral well-being of young women, because "Elvis Presley didn't just represent a new type of music; he represented sexual liberation." "Unlike Bill Haley, who was somewhat overweight and looked like everyone's 'older brother'," Presley generated an "anti-parent outlook" and was the "personification of evil". To many adults, the singer was "the first rock symbol of teenage rebellion. ... they did not like him, and condemned him as depraved. Anti-Negro prejudice doubtless figured in adult antagonism. Regardless of whether parents were aware of the Negro sexual origins of the phrase 'rock 'n' roll,' Presley impressed them as the visual and aural embodiment of sex." In 1956, a critic for the New York Daily News wrote that popular music "has reached its lowest depths in the 'grunt and groin' antics of one Elvis Presley" and the Jesuits denounced him in its weekly magazine, America. Time magazine of June 11, 1956, mockingly referred to the singer as "dreamboat Groaner Elvis ('Hi luh-huh-huh-huv-huv yew-hew') Presley." Even Frank Sinatra opined: "His kind of music is deplorable, a rancid smelling aphrodisiac. It fosters almost totally negative and destructive reactions in young people."

Presley was even seen as a "definite danger to the security of the United States." His actions and motions were called "a strip-tease with clothes on" or "sexual self-gratification on stage". They were compared with "masturbation or riding a microphone". Some saw the singer as a sexual pervert, and psychologists feared that teenage girls and boys could easily be "aroused to sexual indulgence and perversion by certain types of motions and hysteria—the type that was exhibited at the Presley show." In August 1956 in Jacksonville, Florida, a local juvenile court judge called Presley a "savage" and threatened to arrest him if he shook his body while performing at Jacksonville's Florida Theatre, justifying the restrictions by saying his music was undermining the youth of America. Throughout the performance, Presley stood still as ordered but poked fun at the judge by wiggling a finger. Similar attempts to stop his "sinful gyrations" continued for more than a year and included his often-noted January 6, 1957, appearance on The Ed Sullivan Show (during which he performed the spiritual number "Peace in the Valley"), when he was filmed only from the waist up.

In an interview with PBS television, social historian Eric Lott said, "all the citizens' councils in the South called Elvis 'n*gger music' and were terribly afraid that Elvis, white as he was, being ambiguously raced just by being working-class, was going to corrupt the youth of America." Robert Kaiser says Elvis was the first who gave the people "a music that hit them where they lived, deep in their emotions, yes, even below their belts. Other singers had been doing this for generations, but they were black." Therefore, his performance style was frequently criticized. Social guardians blasted anyone responsible for exposing impressionable teenagers to his "gyrating figure and suggestive gestures". The Louisville chief of police, for instance, called for a no-wiggle rule, so as to halt "any lewd, lascivious contortions that would excite the crowd". Even Priscilla Presley confirms that "his performances were labeled obscene. My mother stated emphatically that he was 'a bad influence for teenage girls. He arouses things in them that shouldn't be aroused.'"

According to rhythm and blues artist Hank Ballard, "In white society, the movement of the butt, the shaking of the leg, all that was considered obscene. Now here's this white boy that's grinding and rolling his belly and shaking that notorious leg. I hadn't even seen the black dudes doing that." Presley complained bitterly in a June 27, 1956, interview about being singled out as "obscene". Because of his controversial style of song and stage performances, municipal politicians began denying permits for Presley appearances. This caused teens to pile into cars and travel elsewhere to see him perform. Adult programmers announced they would not play Presley's music on their radio stations because of religious convictions that his music was "devil music" and to racist beliefs that it was "n*gger music". Many of Presley's records were condemned as wicked by Pentecostal preachers, warning congregations to keep  rock and roll music out of their homes and away from their children's ears (especially the music of "that backslidden Pentecostal pup"). However, the economic power of Presley's fans became evident when they tuned in to alternative radio stations playing his records. In an era when radio stations were shifting to an all-music format, in reaction to competition from television, profit-conscious radio station owners learned quickly when sponsors bought more advertising time on new all "rock and roll" stations, some of which reached enormous markets at night with clear channel signals from AM broadcasts.

Presley seemed bemused by all the criticism. On another of the many occasions he was challenged to justify the furor surrounding him, he said, "I don't see how they think [my act] can contribute to juvenile delinquency. If there's anything I've tried to do, I've tried to live a straight, clean life and not set any kind of a bad example. You cannot please everyone."

Perceived inability to overcome background 
Presley's record sales grew quickly throughout the late 1950s, with hits like "All Shook Up" and "(Let Me Be Your) Teddy Bear." Jailhouse Rock, Loving You (both 1957) and King Creole (1958) were released and are regarded as the best of his early films. 
However, critics were not impressed—very few authoritative voices were complimentary. In response, it has been claimed that while "Elvis' success as a singer and movie star dramatically increased his economic capital, his cultural capital never expanded enough for him to transcend the stigma of his background as a truck driver from the rural South... 'No matter how successful Elvis became... he remained fundamentally disreputable in the minds of many Americans... He was the sharecropper's son in the big house, and it always showed.'"

Recognizability amongst the general public
Presley remains an immediately recognizable face even amongst groups not normally recognized as his fans. In 2008, a 1,800-year-old Roman bust described as bearing a "striking" resemblance to Elvis was displayed ahead of an intended auction. A spokesman for the auctioneers said that fans could "be forgiven for thinking that their idol may well have lived a previous life in Rome."

Presley made a large enough impact on society that traditions are carried on to remember him to this day. A candle lighting is held in Memphis, Tennessee, at his Graceland Estate each year on August 15 in his honor. Also, a "nostalgia concert" is held by singers that worked with Presley as a tribute to him. Presley was a big fan of Karate, and an Elvis Presley Memorial Karate Tournament was organized many years ago to let others enjoy something he used to love so much. The tournament has a large turnout, with around 500 competitors each year. Last, a Sock Hop is held, playing his songs and portraying some of his artwork.

See also
Cultural depictions of Elvis Presley
List of best selling music artists
List of most expensive paintings
List of songs about or referencing Elvis Presley
List of halls of fame inducting Elvis Presley
24 Hour Church of Elvis
Elvis Herselvis
Elvis sightings
Jukka Ammondt, a Finnish literature professor who has recorded songs of Elvis Presley in Latin and Sumerian.
Pop-culture tourism

References

Bibliography

"Elvis International Tribute Week." Holidays, Festivals, and Celebrations of the World Dictionary, edited by Helene Henderson, Omnigraphics, Inc., 5th edition, 2015.
"The Transformation of Popular Culture." Modern American Lives: Individuals and Issues in American History Since 1945, Blaine T. Browne, and Robert C. Cottrell, Routledge, 1st edition, 2007

External links
Official site (Elvis Presley Enterprises)
 
Elvis Video and Audio Interviews Elvis Presley Music
ElvisPedia – Elvis's own wiki
Rockhall
Complete Elvis Bio and Discography at Music.com
Elvis Gospel Service

 
Music fandom
Cultural impact by musician
Elvis Presley